Andranambomaro is a rural municipality located in the Atsinanana region of eastern Madagascar. It is situated at the Onive River.

This municipality was founded only in 2015.

References

Populated places in Atsinanana